Punk Rock Menopause is the fifth studio album by UK band The Boys, released in 2014.

On release, it was the first studio album from the band since 1981.  It features  Matt Dangerfield, Casino Steel and Honest John Plain.
.  The album received positive reviews.

The Boys went on tour to support the album, including a nine-date tour of China. However, after the band arrived in China, authorities canceled their tour.  This was in reaction to a crowd stampede at a New Years celebration in Shanghai that killed 36 people . However, the Boys put on three secret performances in China.

Track listing
All tracks composed by Casino Steel, Matt Dangerfield and Honest John Plain; except where indicated
"1976"  Lead vocal Matt Dangerfield 
"I Need You"  Lead vocal Matt Dangerfield 
"I'm a Believer"  Lead vocal Matt Dangerfield 
"She's The Reason"  Lead vocal Honest John Plain 
"Global Warming"  Lead vocal Matt Dangerfield 
"Keep Quiet"  Lead vocal Matt Dangerfield 
"How Hot You Are"  Lead vocal Matt Dangerfield 
"Punk Rock Girl"  Lead vocal Honest John Plain 
"Organ Grinder"  Lead vocal Matt Dangerfield 
"How Can I Miss You"  Lead vocal Honest John Plain 
"What's The Matter With Morris"  Lead vocal Matt Dangerfield 
"Pistol Whipping Momma"  Lead vocal Honest John Plain 
"Baby Bye Bye" (Steel, Dangerfield)  Lead vocal Matt Dangerfield

Personnel
Matt Dangerfield - guitar, vocals
Honest John Plain - guitar, vocals
Casino Steel - keyboards, vocals

References

External links 

The Boys (UK band) albums
2014 albums